West Coast Rangers Football Club is an amateur football club based in Whenuapai, New Zealand.

Formed in 2021 as an amalgamation between Waitakere City and Norwest United, West Coast Rangers previously competed in the Northern League which is part of the qualifying leagues for the New Zealand National League but were relegated after one season.

The women's team currently competes in the New Zealand Women's National League.

The club also competes in both the Chatham Cup and Kate Sheppard Cup, New Zealand's premier knockout tournaments for men and women. Both teams received a bye in the 2021 Chatham Cup and 2021 Kate Sheppard Cup preliminary round with the men's team also receiving a bye in the first round, along with other ranked teams. The men lost their first game of the Chatham Cup when they lost to tier 4 side Ngaruawahia United 2–1. 
The women's team won their first game 2–0 over Hibiscus Coast in the Kate Sheppard Cup.

Current squad

References

External links
Club website
Soccerway profile

Association football clubs in Auckland
2021 establishments in New Zealand
Sport in West Auckland, New Zealand
Association football clubs established in 2021